Fenian may refer to:

Fenians: fraternal organisations dedicated to the establishment of an independent Irish Republic in the 19th and early 20th century
Fenian raids: a series of skirmishes between the Fenians and British Canada
Fenian Rising: an Irish rebellion against Britain in 1867, organized by a Fenian group
Fenian (horse): a 19th-century American racehorse
The Fenians: a California-based Celtic rock band
Fenian Ram: an early submarine
Fianna: warrior bands in Irish and Scottish mythology
Fenian Cycle: a group of Irish myths
 Fenian, an insult used for Celtic F.C. supporters

See also
Fianna (disambiguation)